The Church of England (Worship and Doctrine) Measure 1974, No. 3 is a Church of England Measure passed by the General Synod of the Church of England. The Measure gave the General Synod the power to reform the liturgy of the Church of England.

The Measure was the outcome of the controversy over the use of the 1662 Book of Common Prayer, the conflict between those who wished to preserve the 1662 prayer book and those who advocated new forms of worship that employed modern language and symbolism. The report of the Archbishop's Commission, chaired by Owen Chadwick, was published in 1970 under the title Church and State. It recommended that Parliament should pass the regulation of the church to the General Synod rather than disestablishment.

The sociologist of religion James A. Beckford said there was "a deep cleavage within the Church of England between, on the one hand, the view that the church represented the whole nation and should therefore retain the cultural form in which the nation's ethnic and historical particularity was embodied, and, on the other, the view that the church could only exercise effective influence over the course of events by adapting its liturgy to modern cultural forms".

Opponents of the Measure said it was inconsistent with the Church's status as the national church but were pleased with the provision that the 1662 liturgy could still be used in a minority of parishes. Roger Scruton said the Measure "was to the great detriment of the power and authority of the Church", and added: "it was this measure that has allowed the creeping disestablishment of the Church, so that 'alternative services' can be laid before the congregation as though it were freedom rather than certainty that they wished for".

Notes

Church of England legislation
Christianity and law in the 20th century